Jernej Smukavec (born 6 August 1991) is a Slovenian footballer who plays for SV Ludmannsdorf.

He was playing for Domžale in the Slovenian PrvaLiga.

References

External links
PrvaLiga profile 

1991 births
Living people
Footballers from Ljubljana
Slovenian footballers
Slovenian expatriate footballers
Association football forwards
NK IB 1975 Ljubljana players
NK Dob players
NK Domžale players
NK Radomlje players
Slovenian PrvaLiga players
Slovenian expatriate sportspeople in Austria
Expatriate footballers in Austria